Namukwaya Hajara Diana, also known as Spice Diana, is a Ugandan musician. She started her music career early and studied at Makerere University. Her first manager was Dr Fizol of Avie Records, and she was later managed by Twinkle Star under a fellow musician Kalifah AgaNaga in 2016. She has had several singles including "Anti Kale", "Bukete" and "Bimpe". Spice Diana has also collaborated with both local and international artists that include Pallaso, Ray G, Aganaga and Jamaican Orisha Sound among others.

Early life and education
Spice Diana was educated at Kibuli Demonstration School for primary education and St Peter's Senior Secondary School for her secondary education. She graduated from Makerere University with a Bachelor of Industrial Arts. Spice Diana is struggling to balance between music and school. This is because most of her lecture times collide with her musical performances.

Music career
Spice Diana started her music career in 2014 with her hit single Onsanula that later won her an award in 2015.
Prior to the year 2014, she was being managed by Dr. Fizol of Avenue Records. Spice Diana has signed record labels with Twinkle Star and Humble Management before she went solo.
Spice Diana has many hits including "Anti Kale", "I miss you" and "Buteke". In 2016, Spice Diana decided to organize awards to recognize her team. She named these awards the Team Spice Diana Awards. Only Spice Diana and upcoming artists performed at the award show.

Singles
 Bukete
 Bimpe
 Anti Kale
 Tokombako
 I miss you
 Gwe Nsonga
 Tuli Kuki
 Nyumirwa
 Ninze
 Ndi Mu Love
 Acrobatics
 Sabatula
 Tekinanta
 Sitoma
 Omusheshe ft. [[Ray G]]
 Kokonya ft. Harmonize (musician)
 Kwata Wano
 On You
 Jangu Ondabe ft Rose Ree
 Best Friend ft King Saha
 siri regular
 Doctor 
 Kyuma

Awards and nominations
She won Best Female Breakthrough Artist at the 3rd HiPipo Music Awards in 2015. The prestigious award is based on a popularity vote from the public via Web, SMS, WhatsApp and social media voting.

Incident
In 2017, Spice Diana was invited to perform at the Kampala City Festival where she was beaten up by the Uganda Police after performing one song. The song that Spice Diana performed is called Onsanula and it has a verse which talks about the police being against the people. The lyrics may have been the cause of her beating as she stated on her Social Media Accounts.

See also
List of Ugandan musicians

References

External links
 Spice Diana's channel on YouTube
 Spice Diana profile at HowWe.biz

1996 births
Living people
21st-century Ugandan women singers
Musicians from Kampala